Organized by Enlight Media, the 14th Top Chinese Music Awards were held on April 13, 2014 at Shenzhen Bay Sports Center in Shenzhen, Guangdong, China. Theme of this event is “Because of Music•Together”. Famous musician Gao Xiaosong was appointed as the Chairman of the Jury Committee.

Jury Committee Awards

Popular Music
Best Male Singer: Wakin Chau "Jiang Hu (江湖)"
Best Female Singer: 最佳女歌手 Bibi Zhou "Unlock"
Best Singer-songwriter: Shang Wenjie "Graceland恩赐之地"
Best New Artist: Wu Mochou
Best Musical Band and Group: Yu Quan "再生"
Best Album: Sandee Chan "低调人生"
Best EP: Vision Wei "登“封”造极"

Production
Best Lyrics: Jonathan Lee "Hills (山丘)"
Best Composition: Jonathan Lee "Hills (山丘)"
Best Arrangement:  Sandee Chan "低调人生"
Best Album Producer: Shang Wenjie "Graceland恩赐之地"
Best Song Producer: Jonathan Lee "Hills (山丘)"

Folk/Rock/Dance/Electronica
Best Electronica Artist: Sara Chang"别再问我什么是迪斯科"
Best Dance Music Artist: Vision Wei "登“封”造极"
Best Rock Artist: Tan Weiwei "Tortoise Called Achilles (乌龟的阿基里斯)"
Best Folk Artist: Hao Yun "活着"

Multipurpose
Best Song Written for Visual Media Reno Wang() "时间都去哪了"
Best Music Video Super Junior-M "Break Down"
Best Album Planning  Yu Quan "再生"

Popular Votes Awards
Favorite Male Singer of Mainland China: Jason Zhang
Favorite Female Singer of Mainland China: Bibi Zhou
Favorite Male Singer of Hong Kong and Taiwan: Jay Chou
Favorite Female Singer of Hong Kong and Taiwan: G.E.M.
Favorite New Artist: Oho Ou
Favorite Artist of Multiple Careers (Singing, Acting, Etc.): Zhang Liang
Favorite Musical Band and Group: Super Junior-M

Organizing Committee Awards
Presidential Award: Wu Mochou
Most Influential Figure in Music Industry: Lei Han
2013 Producer of the Year: Khalil Fong
Most Progressive Award: Jason Zhang
New Force of Music: Jike Junyi
Oversea Excellent Stage Performance Award: f(x)

References 

Top Chinese Music Awards
2014 in Chinese music
2014 music awards
Events in Shenzhen
April 2014 events in China